"That's Me", originally "Coachman's Farm", is a song recorded by the Swedish pop group ABBA in 1976. It was released as a single in Japan in July 1977 as the fourth and final single from the album Arrival album. It reached number 75 on the official Japanese charts. Elsewhere, "That's Me" was used as the B-side to ABBA's hit single, "Dancing Queen".

A music video, filmed during the making of 1976 TV special ABBA-dabba-doo!, was made for the song to promote it, which combined original footage, as well as clips and outtakes from previous ABBA "promo videos", and had its debut seventeen years after being actually filmed, as part of the More ABBA Gold video compilation in 1993.

A greatest hits compilation by Agnetha released internationally in 1998 was named after this song (see That's Me), one of her favorite ABBA songs.

Cover versions
 Romanian singer Angela Similea used the instrumental for a song recorded in the 1970s in Romanian, "Simfonia iernii" (en. - "Winter Symphony").
 Pink Lady performed a Japanese-language version of the song in their 1978 live album America! America! America!.
 ABBA cover band Arrival covered this song on their 1999 First Flight tribute album.
 A dance cover of the song by Sabu was included on the 2001 Japanese import ABBA Ibiza Caliente Mix compilation.

References

External links
Abba4therecord.com

1977 singles
1976 songs
ABBA songs
Songs written by Benny Andersson and Björn Ulvaeus
Songs written by Stig Anderson
Polar Music singles
Music videos directed by Lasse Hallström